Calliethilla is a genus of flies in the family Tachinidae.

Species
C. caerulea Shima, 1979

References

Diptera of Asia
Exoristinae
Tachinidae genera